Several Canadian naval units have been named HMCS Ungava.
 , a  commissioned on 5 September 1941 and decommissioned on 3 April 1946.
 , a  commissioned on 4 June 1954 and decommissioned on 23 August 1957 upon her transfer to Turkey.

Battle honours
 Atlantic 1941–45
 Gulf of St. Lawrence 1944

Royal Canadian Navy ship names